The following is a list of the 23 cantons of the Bas-Rhin department, in France, following the French canton reorganisation which came into effect in March 2015:

 Bischwiller
 Bouxwiller
 Brumath
 Erstein
 Haguenau
 Hœnheim
 Illkirch-Graffenstaden
 Ingwiller
 Lingolsheim
 Molsheim
 Mutzig
 Obernai
 Reichshoffen
 Saverne
 Schiltigheim
 Sélestat
 Strasbourg-1
 Strasbourg-2
 Strasbourg-3
 Strasbourg-4
 Strasbourg-5
 Strasbourg-6
 Wissembourg

References